Peter Terrence Blackmore  (born 11 February 1945) is an Australian politician and former Mayor of the City of Maitland.

Born to George and Kathleen Blackmore, he attended Newcastle Technical High School and became a salesman, covering fields such as real estate and catering. From 1974 to 1990, he owned a service station. Blackmore has two daughters with his second wife, Lynette Ruth Steel. He also has two sons Rodney and Simon peter with his first wife.

In 1986 he was elected Mayor of Maitland, a position he held until 1990, and was reelected to the position of Mayor in September 2008 before concluding his term. In 1991 he was elected to the New South Wales Legislative Assembly for the seat of Maitland as a member of the Liberal Party. He held the seat until his defeat by Labor member for Waratah John Price in 1999.

Blackmore contested the seat as an independent after Price's retirement at the 2007 state election, but was narrowly defeated by Labor candidate Frank Terenzini.

References

 

1945 births
Living people
Liberal Party of Australia members of the Parliament of New South Wales
Independent politicians in Australia
Members of the New South Wales Legislative Assembly
Recipients of the Medal of the Order of Australia